The Baptist Convention of New York (BCNY) is a group of churches affiliated with the Southern Baptist Convention located in the U.S. state of New York, Northern New Jersey, and Connecticut. Headquartered in East Syracuse, New York, the convention is made up of 8 Baptist associations and around 423 churches as of 2010.

Affiliated Organization 
BCNY Foundation - Assist with the financial needs of the convention

References

External links
Baptist Convention of New York

 

Baptist Christianity in New York (state)
Conventions associated with the Southern Baptist Convention
Baptist Christianity in New Jersey
Christianity in Connecticut